Óscar Guido Trejo (born 26 April 1988) is an Argentine professional footballer who plays for Spanish club Rayo Vallecano as an attacking midfielder or forward.

Club career
Trejo was born in Santiago del Estero. A product of Boca Juniors' youth system, he only played once for its first team but, in the game against Club Almagro, he scored in a 3–2 away loss after a mere minutes on the pitch – the match was suspended after 63 minutes.

In late December 2006, Trejo was bought by RCD Mallorca in Spain, still having not signed his first professional contract. Boca sustained otherwise and the case was taken to FIFA, which ultimately decided for the Balearic Islands club. He made his first appearance in La Liga on 8 April 2007, against Getafe CF; having come on as a 90th-minute substitute, he managed to find the net for a final 2–0 home victory.

Sparingly used over the following seasons, Trejo managed to score in the 2007–08 edition of the Copa del Rey in a 2–1 home win over Real Madrid (3–1 aggregate). After an unassuming 2008–09, he was loaned the following campaign to Segunda División side Elche CF.

On 15 August 2010, a similar move ensued, with Trejo joining Rayo Vallecano in the same tier. He returned to the top flight in the 2011–12 season, scoring four goals from 33 appearances for Sporting de Gijón but suffering relegation.

In the summer of 2012, Premier League's West Ham United made an attempt to buy Trejo, but the deal fell apart. One year later he eventually left Spain, going on to spend several years in the French Ligue 1 with Toulouse FC after agreeing to a four-year contract.

Trejo returned to Rayo on 21 June 2017 as director of football David Cobeño's first signing, six years after leaving. He scored a career-high 12 goals in his first year, combining with Raúl de Tomás for 36 as the club returned to the top division as champions.

Career statistics

Club

Honours
Rayo Vallecano
Segunda División: 2017–18

References

External links

1988 births
Living people
People from Santiago del Estero
Sportspeople from Santiago del Estero Province
Argentine footballers
Association football midfielders
Association football forwards
Argentine Primera División players
Boca Juniors footballers
La Liga players
Segunda División players
RCD Mallorca players
Elche CF players
Rayo Vallecano players
Sporting de Gijón players
Ligue 1 players
Championnat National 3 players
Toulouse FC players
Argentine expatriate footballers
Expatriate footballers in Spain
Expatriate footballers in France
Argentine expatriate sportspeople in Spain
Argentine expatriate sportspeople in France